Media Take Out (also known as MTO News) is a blog-style gossip website mainly focused on entertainment and celebrity news involving African Americans topics and celebrities.

The website was founded by Fred Mwangaguhunga, a former corporate lawyer. Mwangaguhunga was born to Ugandan parents in Washington, D.C., is a graduate of John Jay College of Criminal Justice at the City University of New York, and received two degrees from Columbia University.

Exclusives have been quoted by Good Morning America, Watch What Happens Live with Andy Cohen, The New York Times, BET Style, MTV News, and the "Page Six" column of the New York Post, and by radio personalities including Wendy Williams, Howard Stern, and Tom Joyner. Media Take Out has broken several stories, including Kim Kardashian's first pregnancy, Remy Ma's criminal charges and Michael Jordan's divorce. Mwangaguhunga has stated, "We get 90% of our stories from insiders looking to spill the beans like hairstylists, bodyguards or bitter ex-girlfriends".

References

External links
 MediaTakeOut.com
 MediaTakeOut.com one of the Top 50 Black Owned Websites
 NY TIMES: A Gossip Site Finds Its Niche
 VICE: Meet The Lawyer Who Runs Media Take Out
 Media Take Out.com Dishin the Dirt on African American Celebs: But Skeptics say It's All Lies
 (audio) NPR Interviews owner
 
 Mediatakeout

American blogs
Gossip blogs